This is a list of municipalities in France which have standing links to local communities in other countries known as "town twinning" (usually in Europe) or "sister cities" (usually in the rest of the world).

A

Ab–Am
Abbeville

 Argos, Greece
 Burgess Hill, England, United Kingdom

Achères

 Amarante, Portugal
 Großkrotzenburg, Germany
 Stonehaven, Scotland, United Kingdom

Agen

 Corpus Christi, United States
 Dinslaken, Germany
 Llanelli, Wales, United Kingdom
 Toledo, Spain
 Tuapse, Russia

L'Aigle

 Aigle, Switzerland
 Clausthal-Zellerfeld, Germany
 Spišská Nová Ves, Slovakia

Aix-en-Provence

 Ashkelon, Israel
 Bath, England, United Kingdom
 Carthage, Tunisia
 Coimbra, Portugal
 Granada, Spain
 Perugia, Italy
 Tübingen, Germany

Aix-les-Bains

 Milena, Italy
 Moulay Yacoub, Morocco
 Zhangjiajie, China

Ajaccio
 La Maddalena, Italy

Albi

 Girona, Spain
 Palo Alto, United States
 Randwick, Australia

Alençon

 Basingstoke and Deane, England, United Kingdom
 Quakenbrück, Germany

Alès
 Kilmarnock, Scotland, United Kingdom

Alfortville

 El Biar, Algeria
 Cantanhede, Portugal
 Oshakan, Armenia
 San Benedetto del Tronto, Italy

Allauch

 Armavir, Armenia
 Kadima-Zoran, Israel
 Vaterstetten, Germany
 Vico Equense, Italy

Ambérieu-en-Bugey
 Mering, Germany

Amiens

 Darlington, England, United Kingdom
 Dortmund, Germany
 Görlitz, Germany

 Tulsa, United States

An
Andernos-les-Bains

 Largs, Scotland, United Kingdom
 Nußloch, Germany
 Segorbe, Spain

Andrésy

 Haren, Germany
 Międzyrzecz, Poland
 Oundle, England, United Kingdom
 Westerwolde, Netherlands

Angers

 Austin, United States
 Bamako, Mali
 Haarlem, Netherlands
 Osnabrück, Germany
 Pisa, Italy
 Södertälje, Sweden
 Toruń, Poland
 Wigan, England, United Kingdom
 Yantai, China

Anglet
 Ansbach, Germany

Angoulême

 Bury, England, United Kingdom
 Chaves, Portugal
 Gelendzhik, Russia
 Hildesheim, Germany
 Hoffman Estates, United States
 Saguenay, Canada
 Ségou, Mali
 Turda, Romania
 Vitoria-Gasteiz, Spain

Aniche

 Bobingen, Germany
 Nový Bor, Czech Republic

Annecy

 Bayreuth, Germany
 Cheltenham, England, United Kingdom
 Liptovský Mikuláš, Slovakia
 Sainte-Thérèse, Canada
 Vicenza, Italy

Annemasse

 Gaggenau, Germany
 Sieradz, Poland 

Annonay

 Backnang, Germany
 Barge, Italy
 Chelmsford, England, United Kingdom

Anor

 Aken, Germany
 Gizałki, Poland
 Momignies, Belgium
 Příbram, Czech Republic

Antibes

 Aalborg, Denmark
 Desenzano del Garda, Italy
 Eilat, Israel
 Kinsale, Ireland
 Krasnogorsk, Russia
 Newport Beach, United States
 Olympia, Greece
 Schwäbisch Gmünd, Germany

Antony

 Antelias, Lebanon
 Collegno, Italy
 Davtashen (Yerevan), Armenia
 Eleftheroupoli, Greece
 Hammam-Lif, Tunisia
 Lewisham, England, United Kingdom
 Lexington, United States
 Olomouc, Czech Republic
 Protvino, Russia
 Reinickendorf (Berlin), Germany
 Sderot, Israel

Ap–Av
Apt

 Bakel, Senegal
 Boussu, Belgium
 Thiene, Italy

Argentan

 Abingdon-on-Thames, England, United Kingdom
 Baja, Hungary
 Rotenburg an der Fulda, Germany

Argenteuil

 Alessandria, Italy
 Dessau-Roßlau, Germany
 Hunedoara, Romania
 West Dunbartonshire, Scotland, United Kingdom 

Arles

 Fulda, Germany
 Jerez de la Frontera, Spain
 Kalymnos, Greece
 Pskov, Russia
 Sagne, Mauritania
 Vercelli, Italy
 Verviers, Belgium
 Wisbech, England, United Kingdom
 York, United States

Armentières

 Litoměřice, Czech Republic
 Osterode am Harz, Germany
 Stalybridge, England, United Kingdom

Arras

 Deva, Romania
 Herten, Germany
 Ipswich, England, United Kingdom
 Oudenaarde, Belgium

Asnières-sur-Seine

 Spandau (Berlin), Germany
 Stockton-on-Tees, England, United Kingdom

Athis-Mons

 Ballina, Ireland
 Rothenburg ob der Tauber, Germany
 Sinaia, Romania

Aubagne
 Argentona, Spain

Aubenas

 Cesenatico, Italy
 Schwarzenbek, Germany
 Sierre, Switzerland
 Zelzate, Belgium

Aubergenville

 Alcobaça, Portugal
 Bełchatów, Poland
 Dieburg, Germany
 Horndean, England, United Kingdom

Aubervilliers

 Beit Jala, Palestine
 Jena, Germany

Aubière

 Grevenmacher, Luxembourg
 Sperlonga, Italy

Aubigny-sur-Nère

 Haddington, Scotland, United Kingdom
 Oxford, United States
 Plopana, Romania
 Vlotho, Germany

Auch

 Calatayud, Spain
 Memmingen, Germany

Aurillac

 Altea, Spain
 Bassetlaw, England, United Kingdom
 Bocholt, Germany
 Bougouni, Mali
 Vorona, Romania

Autun

 Arévalo, Spain
 Ingelheim am Rhein, Germany
 Kawagoe, Japan
 Stevenage, England, United Kingdom

Auxerre

 Greve in Chianti, Italy
 Płock, Poland
 Redditch, England, United Kingdom
 Roscoff, France
 Saint-Amarin, France
 Worms, Germany

Avignon

 Colchester, England, United Kingdom
 Diourbel, Senegal
 Guanajuato, Mexico
 New Haven, United States
 Siena, Italy
 Tarragona, Spain
 Tortosa, Spain
 Wetzlar, Germany

B

Ba
Bagnères-de-Bigorre

 Alhama de Granada, Spain
 Granarolo dell'Emilia, Italy
 Inverurie, Scotland, United Kingdom
 Malvern, England, United Kingdom
 Tutzing, Germany

Bagneux

 Circoscrizione 6 (Turin), Italy
 Grand-Bourg, Guadeloupe, France
 Vanadzor, Armenia

Bagnolet

 Akbou, Algeria
 Massala, Mali
 Oranienburg, Germany
 Le Robert, Martinique, France
 Shatila, Lebanon
 Sesto Fiorentino, Italy

Bagnols-sur-Cèze

 Braunfels, Germany
 Carcaixent, Spain
 Eeklo, Belgium
 Feltre, Italy
 Kiskunfélegyháza, Hungary
 Newbury, England, United Kingdom

Bailleul

 Hawick, Scotland, United Kingdom
 Izegem, Belgium
 Kyritz, Germany
 Wałcz, Poland
 Werne, Germany

Bar-le-Duc

 Griesheim, Germany
 Gyönk, Hungary
 Wilkau-Haßlau, Germany

Bastia

 Erding, Germany
 Viareggio, Italy

La Baule-Escoublac

 Homburg, Germany
 Inverness, Scotland, United Kingdom
 Vila Real de Santo António, Portugal

Bayeux

 Chojnice, Poland
 Dorchester, England, United Kingdom
 Eindhoven, Netherlands
 Lübbecke, Germany
 Voss, Norway

Be–Bl
Beaune

 Bensheim, Germany
 Kōshū, Japan
 Krems an der Donau, Austria
 Malmedy, Belgium
 Nantucket, United States

Beaupréau

 Abergavenny, Wales, United Kingdom
 Münsingen, Germany

Beauvais

 Dej, Romania
 Maidstone, United Kingdom
 Setúbal, Portugal
 Tczew, Poland
 Witten, Germany

Bègles

 Bray, Ireland
 Collado Villalba, Spain
 Suhl, Germany

Belfort

 Delémont, Switzerland
 Leonberg, Germany
 Stafford, England, United Kingdom
 Tanghin-Dassouri, Burkina Faso
 Zaporizhzhia, Ukraine

Berck

 Bad Honnef, Germany
 Hythe, England, United Kingdom

Bergerac

 Faenza, Italy
 Hohen Neuendorf, Germany
 Kenitra, Morocco
 Ostrów Wielkopolski, Poland
 Repentigny, Canada

Besançon

 Bielsko-Biała, Poland
 Bistriţa, Romania
 Charlottesville, United States
 Douroula, Burkina Faso
 Freiburg im Breisgau, Germany
 Hadera, Israel
 Kirklees, England, United Kingdom
 Kuopio, Finland
 Man, Ivory Coast
 Matsumae, Japan
 Neuchâtel, Switzerland
 Pavia, Italy
 Tver, Russia

Béziers

 Anping (Tainan), Taiwan
 Heilbronn, Germany
 Stavropol, Russia

Bezons

 Downpatrick, Northern Ireland, United Kingdom
 Szekszárd, Hungary

Biarritz

 Augusta, United States
 Cascais, Portugal
 Ixelles, Belgium
 Jerez de la Frontera, Spain
 Zaragoza, Spain

Bischwiller

 Hornberg, Germany
 Zgierz, Poland

Blagnac
 Buxtehude, Germany

Le Blanc-Mesnil

 Beni Douala, Algeria
 Debre Berhan, Ethiopia
 Petergof, Russia
 San Giorgio Albanese, Italy
 Sandwell, England, United Kingdom

Blois

 Cáceres, Spain
 Lewes, England, United Kingdom
 Sighişoara, Romania
 Urbino, Italy
 Waldshut-Tiengen, Germany
 Weimar, Germany

Bo
Bobigny

 Potsdam, Germany
 Serpukhov, Russia

Bois-Colombes
 Neu-Ulm, Germany

Bois-Guillaume

 Baix Camp, Spain
 Kegworth, England, United Kingdom
 Szemud, Poland
 Tikaré, Burkina Faso
 Torgiano, Italy
 Uelzen, Germany
 Wejherowo County, Poland

Bondoufle
 Nörten-Hardenberg, Germany

Bordeaux

 Ashdod, Israel
 Baku, Azerbaijan
 Bamako, Mali
 Bilbao, Spain
 Bristol, England, United Kingdom
 Casablanca, Morocco
 Fukuoka, Japan
 Kraków, Poland
 Lima, Peru
 Los Angeles, United States
 Madrid, Spain
 Munich, Germany
 Oran, Algeria
 Ouagadougou, Burkina Faso
 Porto, Portugal
 Quebec City, Canada
 Ramallah, Palestine
 Riga, Latvia
 Saint Petersburg, Russia
 Wuhan, China

Boulogne-Billancourt

 Anderlecht, Belgium
 Guang'an, China
 Irving, United States
 Marino, Italy
 Hammersmith and Fulham, England, United Kingdom
 Neukölln (Berlin), Germany
 Pančevo, Serbia
 Ra'anana, Israel
 Sousse, Tunisia
 Zaanstad, Netherlands

Boulogne-sur-Mer

 Folkestone, England, United Kingdom
 La Plata, Argentina
 Safi, Morocco
 Zweibrücken, Germany

Bourges

 Augsburg, Germany
 Aveiro, Portugal
 Forlì, Italy
 Koszalin, Poland
 Palencia, Spain
 Peterborough, England, United Kingdom
 Yoshkar-Ola, Russia

Le Bourget

 Amityville, United States
 Cullera, Spain
 Little Falls, United States
 Zhukovsky, Russia

Bourgoin-Jallieu

 Bergisch Gladbach, Germany
 Conselice, Italy
 Dunstable, England, United Kingdom
 Rehau, Germany
 Velsen, Netherlands
 Wujiang (Suzhou), China

Bourg-de-Péage

 East Grinstead, England, United Kingdom
 Mindelheim, Germany
 Sant Feliu de Guíxols, Spain
 Schwaz, Austria
 Verbania, Italy

Bourg-en-Bresse

 Aylesbury, England, United Kingdom
 Bad Kreuznach, Germany
 Brzeg, Poland
 El Kef, Tunisia
 Namur, Belgium
 Parma, Italy
 San Severo, Italy
 Yinchuan, China

Bourg-la-Reine

 Kenilworth, England, United Kingdom
 Monheim am Rhein, Germany
 Reghin, Romania
 Sulejówek, Poland

Le Bouscat

 Arnstadt, Germany
 Glen Ellyn, United States

Br–Bu
Brest

 Cádiz, Spain
 Constanța, Romania
 Denver, United States
 Dún Laoghaire, Ireland
 Kiel, Germany
 Plymouth, England, United Kingdom
 Saponé, Burkina Faso
 Taranto, Italy
 Yokosuka, Japan

Bressuire

 Fraserburgh, Scotland, United Kingdom
 Friedberg, Germany
 Hodac, Romania
 Kpalimé, Togo
 Leixlip, Ireland
 Mequinenza, Spain
 Parczew, Poland
 Ryazan, Russia

Brie-Comte-Robert

 Bagnolo Mella, Italy
 Litvínov, Czech Republic
 Olbernhau, Germany
 Stadtbergen, Germany

Brignoles

 Bruneck, Italy
 Groß-Gerau, Germany
 Szamotuły, Poland
 Tielt, Belgium

Brive-la-Gaillarde

 Guimarães, Portugal
 Joliette, Canada
 Lauf an der Pegnitz, Germany
 Melitopol, Ukraine
 Sikasso, Mali

Bron

 Cumbernauld, Scotland, United Kingdom
 Grimma, Germany
 Talavera de la Reina, Spain
 Weingarten, Germany

Bruay-la-Buissière

 Fröndenberg, Germany
 Kédougou, Senegal
 Merbes-le-Château, Belgium
 Olkusz, Poland
 Schwerte, Germany

Bruges

 Leven, Scotland, United Kingdom 
 Polanco, Spain
 Umkirch, Germany

Brunoy

 Espinho, Portugal
 Reigate and Banstead, England, United Kingdom
 Wittlich, Germany

Bussy-Saint-Georges

 Kiryat Ekron, Israel
 Meiningen, Germany
 Radcliffe-on-Trent, England, United Kingdom
 San Giuliano Milanese, Italy

C

Ca–Ce
Cabourg

 Atlantic City, United States
 Bad Homburg vor der Höhe, Germany
 Bromont, Canada
 Chur, Switzerland
 Jūrmala, Latvia
 Mayrhofen, Austria
 Mondorf-les-Bains, Luxembourg
 Oussouye, Senegal
 Salcombe, England, United Kingdom
 Spa, Belgium
 Terracina, Italy

Cachan
 Wolfenbüttel (district), Germany

Caen

 Alexandria, United States
 Anzio, Italy
 Nashville, United States
 Ohrid, North Macedonia
 Portsmouth, England, United Kingdom
 Reșița, Romania
 Thiès, Senegal
 Würzburg, Germany

Cagnes-sur-Mer
 Passau, Germany

Calais

 Bardejov, Slovakia
 Brăila, Romania
 Dover, England, United Kingdom
 Duisburg, Germany

 Wismar, Germany
 Xiangtan, China

Caluire-et-Cuire
 Nichelino, Italy

Cambrai

 Châteauguay, Canada
 Cieszyn, Poland
 Esztergom, Hungary
 Gravesham, England, United Kingdom
 Pushkin, Russia

Cannes

 Acapulco, Mexico
 Beverly Hills, United States
 Kensington and Chelsea, England, United Kingdom

 Sanya, China
 Shizuoka, Japan

Le Cannet

 Benidorm, Spain
 Königstein im Taunus, Germany
 Lafayette, United States
 Magione, Italy
 Vila do Conde, Portugal

Canteleu

 Buchholz in der Nordheide, Germany
 Kongoussi, Burkina Faso
 New Milton, England, United Kingdom
 Wołów, Poland

Carcassonne

 Baeza, Spain
 Eggenfelden, Germany
 Kesklinn (Tallinn), Estonia

Carros

 Grodzisk Mazowiecki, Poland
 San Giustino, Italy

Cavaillon

 Langhirano, Italy
 Weinheim, Germany

La Celle-Saint-Cloud

 Beckum, Germany
 Settat, Morocco

Cenon

 Hartford, United States
 Laredo, Spain
 Meknes, Morocco
 Paredes de Coura, Portugal

Cergy

 Columbia, United States

 West Lancashire, England, United Kingdom

Cesson

 Bababé, Mauritania
 Buchloe, Germany
 Chipping Sodbury, England, United Kingdom
 Vicovu de Sus, Romania

Cesson-Sévigné
 Waltrop, Germany

Ch
Châlette-sur-Loing

 Dniprovskyi (Kyiv), Ukraine
 Nilüfer, Turkey
 Ponte de Lima, Portugal
 San Antonio de los Baños, Cuba

Châlons-en-Champagne

 Bobo-Dioulasso, Burkina Faso
 Ilkeston, England, United Kingdom
 Mirabel, Canada
 Neuss, Germany
 Razgrad, Bulgaria
 Wittenberge, Germany

Chalon-sur-Saône

 Novara, Italy
 Solingen, Germany
 St Helens, England, United Kingdom

Chamalières
 Geretsried, Germany

Chambéry

 Albstadt, Germany
 Blainville, Canada
 Ouahigouya, Burkina Faso
 Shawinigan, Canada
 Turin, Italy
 Zhangjiakou, China

Chambray-lès-Tours

 Bad Camberg, Germany
 Võru, Estonia

Chamonix-Mont-Blanc

 Aosta, Italy
 Aspen, United States
 Cilaos, Réunion, France
 Courmayeur, Italy
 Davos, Switzerland
 Fujiyoshida, Japan
 Garmisch-Partenkirchen, Germany

Champigny-sur-Marne

 Alpiarça, Portugal
 Bernau bei Berlin, Germany
 Jalapa, Nicaragua
 Musselburgh, Scotland, United Kingdom
 Rosignano Marittimo, Italy

Champs-sur-Marne

 Bradley Stoke, England, United Kingdom
 Quart de Poblet, Spain

Chantepie

 Krško, Slovenia
 Obrigheim, Germany

Charenton-le-Pont

 Borgo Val di Taro, Italy
 Büren, Germany
 Tempelhof-Schöneberg (Berlin), Germany
 Trowbridge, England, United Kingdom
 Zikhron Ya'akov, Israel

Charleville-Mézières

 Dülmen, Germany
 Euskirchen, Germany
 Mantua, Italy
 Nevers, France
 Nordhausen, Germany
 Tolosa, Spain

Chartres

 Bethlehem, Palestine
 Chichester, England, United Kingdom
 Évora, Portugal
 León, Peru
 Ravenna, Italy
 Sakurai, Japan
 Speyer, Germany

Châteaudun

 Arklow, Ireland
 Kroměříž, Czech Republic
 Marchena, Spain
 Schweinfurt, Germany

Châteauroux

 Bittou, Burkina Faso
 Fresno, United States
 Gütersloh, Germany
 Jinhua, China
 Olsztyn, Poland

Château-Thierry

 Cisnădie, Romania
 Grybów (rural gmina), Poland
 Mosbach, Germany
 Pößneck, Germany

Châtellerault

 Castellón de la Plana, Spain
 Corby, England, United Kingdom
 Hamilton, Scotland, United Kingdom
 Kaya, Burkina Faso
 New Brunswick, Canada
 Piła, Poland
 Velbert, Germany

Châtenay-Malabry

 Bergneustadt, Germany
 Bracciano, Italy
 Kos, Greece
 Landsmeer, Netherlands
 Wellington, England, United Kingdom

Châtillon

 Aywaille, Belgium
 Genzano di Roma, Italy
 Merseburg, Germany

Chaumont

 Ashton-under-Lyne, England, United Kingdom
 Bad Nauheim, Germany
 Ivrea, Italy
 Owasso, United States

Chauny

 Andenne, Belgium
 Bergheim, Germany

Chaville

 Alsfeld, Germany
 Barnet, England, United Kingdom
 Settimo Torinese, Italy

Chelles
 Lindau, Germany

Chemillé-en-Anjou
 Aspach, Germany

Chennevières-sur-Marne

 Durmersheim, Germany
 Littlehampton, England, United Kingdom
 Tukums, Latvia

Cherbourg-en-Cotentin

 Allmendingen, Germany
 Bremerhaven, Germany
 Coubalan, Senegal
 Deva, Romania
 Northeim, Germany
 Poole, England, United Kingdom
 Veles, North Macedonia

Le Chesnay
 Heppenheim, Germany

Choisy-le-Roi

 Đống Đa (Hanoi), Vietnam
 Hennigsdorf, Germany
 Lugo, Italy
 Târnova, Romania

Cholet

 Dénia, Spain
 Dorohoi, Romania
 Oldenburg, Germany
 Solihull, England, United Kingdom

Ci–Cl
La Ciotat

 Bridgwater, England, United Kingdom
 Kranj, Slovenia
 Singen, Germany
 Torre Annunziata, Italy

Cissé is a member of the Charter of European Rural Communities, a town twinning association across the European Union, alongside with:

 Bienvenida, Spain
 Bièvre, Belgium
 Bucine, Italy
 Cashel, Ireland
 Desborough, England, United Kingdom
 Esch (Haaren), Netherlands
 Hepstedt, Germany
 Ibănești, Romania
 Kandava (Tukums), Latvia
 Kannus, Finland
 Kolindros, Greece
 Lassee, Austria
 Medzev, Slovakia
 Moravče, Slovenia
 Næstved, Denmark
 Nagycenk, Hungary
 Nadur, Malta
 Ockelbo, Sweden
 Pano Lefkara, Cyprus
 Põlva, Estonia
 Samuel (Soure), Portugal
 Slivo Pole, Bulgaria
 Starý Poddvorov, Czech Republic
 Strzyżów, Poland
 Tisno, Croatia
 Troisvierges, Luxembourg
 Žagarė (Joniškis), Lithuania

Clamart

 Artashat, Armenia
 Lüneburg, Germany
 Majadahonda, Spain
 Penamacor, Portugal
 Scunthorpe, England, United Kingdom

Les Clayes-sous-Bois

 Ponte da Barca, Portugal
 Röthenbach an der Pegnitz, Germany

Clermont-Ferrand

 Aberdeen, Scotland, United Kingdom
 Braga, Portugal
 Gomel, Belarus
 Norman, United States
 Oviedo, Spain
 Regensburg, Germany
 Salford, England, United Kingdom

Clichy

 Heidenheim an der Brenz, Germany
 Rubí, Spain
 Sankt Pölten, Austria
 Santo Tirso, Portugal
 Southwark, England, United Kingdom

Cluses

 Beaverton, United States
 Trossingen, Germany

Co–Cr
Cognac

 Boala, Burkina Faso
 Bozhou, China
 Denison, United States
 Königswinter, Germany
 Michalovce, Slovakia
 Perth, Scotland
 Pisco, Peru
 Tovuz, Azerbaijan
 Valdepeñas, Spain
 Vyškov, Czech Republic

Colmar

 Eisenstadt, Austria
 Győr, Hungary
 Lucca, Italy
 Princeton, United States
 Schongau, Germany
 Sint-Niklaas, Belgium
 Vale of White Horse, England, United Kingdom

Colombes
 Frankenthal, Germany

Colomiers
 Victoriaville, Canada

Combs-la-Ville

 Baia Mare, Romania
 Dali, Cyprus
 Duderstadt, Germany
 Oswestry, England, United Kingdom
 Petite-Île, Réunion, France
 R' Kiz, Mauritania
 Salaberry-de-Valleyfield, Canada

Compiègne

 Arona, Italy
 Bury St Edmunds, England, United Kingdom
 Elbląg, Poland
 Guimarães, Portugal
 Huy, Belgium
 Jezzine, Lebanon
 Kiryat Tiv'on, Israel
 Landshut, Germany
 Larache, Morocco
 Raleigh, United States
 Shirakawa, Japan
 Vianden, Luxembourg
 Ziguinchor, Senegal

Concarneau

 Bielefeld, Germany
 M'Bour, Senegal
 Penzance, England, United Kingdom

Conflans-Sainte-Honorine

 Chimay, Belgium
 Hanau, Germany
 Ramsgate, England, United Kingdom

Corbeil-Essonnes

 Alzira, Spain
 Belinho e Mar (Esposende), Portugal
 East Dunbartonshire, Scotland, United Kingdom
 Sindelfingen, Germany

Cormeilles-en-Parisis
 Ware, England, United Kingdom

Couëron

 Fleurus, Belgium
 Wexford, Ireland

Coulaines

 Kitty Hawk, United States
 Kouré, Niger
 Madona, Latvia
 Weyhe, Germany

Courbevoie

 Azov, Russia
 Beit Mery, Lebanon
 Enfield, England, United Kingdom
 Freudenstadt, Germany

La Courneuve

 Ocotal, Nicaragua
 Vitulazio, Italy
 Yako, Burkina Faso

Cournon-d'Auvergne

 Ariccia, Italy
 Lichtenfels, Germany

Creil

 Bethlehem, Palestine
 Chorzów, Poland
 Dakhla, Western Sahara
 Marl, Germany
 Nabadji Civol, Senegal
 Nefta, Tunisia
 Ouro Sogui, Senegal
 Pendle, England, United Kingdom

Crépy-en-Valois

 Antoing, Belgium
 Płońsk, Poland
 Zell am Mosel, Germany

Créteil

 Les Abymes, Guadeloupe, France
 Falkirk, Scotland, United Kingdom
 Gyumri, Armenia
 Kiryat Yam, Israel
 Mataró, Spain
 Loulé, Portugal
 Playa (Havana), Cuba
 Salzgitter, Germany

Le Creusot

 Bor, Serbia
 Blieskastel, Germany
 Majdanpek, Serbia

Crosne

 Belœil, Belgium
 Maybole, Scotland, United Kingdom
 Rýmařov, Czech Republic
 Schotten, Germany

Cusset

 Aiud, Romania
 Neusäß, Germany

D
Dainville

 Albertslund, Denmark
 Mölndal, Sweden
 Říčany, Czech Republic
 Whitstable, England, United Kingdom

Dammarie-lès-Lys

 Arcos de Valdevez, Portugal
 Eppelheim, Germany
 Montebelluna, Italy
 Tata, Hungary

Décines-Charpieu

 Arcos de Valdevez, Portugal
 Monsummano Terme, Italy
 Stepanavan, Armenia

Deuil-la-Barre

 Frankfurt, Germany
 Lourinhã, Portugal
 Vác, Hungary
 Winsford, England, United Kingdom

Dieppe
 Dieppe, Canada

Dijon

 Białystok, Poland
 Cluj-Napoca, Romania
 Chefchaouen, Morocco
 Dakar, Senegal
 Dallas, United States
 Guimarães, Portugal
 Mainz, Germany

 Prague 6 (Prague), Czech Republic
 Reggio Emilia, Italy
 Skopje, North Macedonia
 Volgograd, Russia
 York, England, United Kingdom

Dole

 Carlow, Ireland
 Chaohu, China
 Kostroma, Russia
 Lahr, Germany
 Northwich, England, United Kingdom
 Sestri Levante, Italy
 Tábor, Czech Republic

Domont

 Buja, Italy
 Germering, Germany
 Shepshed, England, United Kingdom
 Wolsztyn, Poland

Douai

 Dédougou, Burkina Faso
 Harrow, England, United Kingdom
 Kenosha, United States

 Recklinghausen, Germany
 Seraing, Belgium

Douchy-les-Mines

 Méguet, Burkina Faso
 Mielec, Poland
 Vila Nova de Poiares, Portugal

Draguignan
 Tuttlingen, Germany

Drancy

 Eisenhüttenstadt, Germany
 Lyubertsy, Russia
 Prague 6 (Prague), Czech Republic
 Willenhall, England, United Kingdom

Dreux

 Almeirim, Portugal
 Bautzen, Germany
 Evesham, England, United Kingdom
 Koudougou, Burkina Faso
 Melsungen, Germany
 Todi, Italy

Dunkirk

 Gaza City, Palestine
 Krefeld, Germany
 Middlesbrough, England, United Kingdom
 Qinhuangdao, China
 Ramat HaSharon, Israel
 Rostock, Germany

E
Eaubonne

 Budenheim, Germany
 Matlock, England, United Kingdom

Échirolles
 Grugliasco, Italy

Élancourt

 Attard, Malta
 Cassina de' Pecchi, Italy
 Gräfenhainichen, Germany
 Laubach, Germany

Elbeuf
 Lingen, Germany

Épernay

 Ettlingen, Germany
 Clevedon, England, United Kingdom
 Fada N'gourma, Burkina Faso
 Middelkerke, Belgium
 Montespertoli, Italy

Épinal

 Bitola, North Macedonia
 Chieri, Italy
 Gembloux, Belgium
 La Crosse, United States
 Loughborough, England, United Kingdom
 Nový Jičín, Czech Republic
 Schwäbisch Hall, Germany

Épinay-sous-Sénart

 Isernhagen, Germany
 Peacehaven, England, United Kingdom

Épinay-sur-Seine

 Alcobendas, Spain
 Oberursel, Germany
 South Tyneside, England, United Kingdom

Éragny

 Komló, Hungary
 Munster, Germany
 Nioko, Burkina Faso

Ermont

 Adria, Italy
 Banbury, England, United Kingdom
 Lampertheim, Germany
 Loja, Spain
 Longwan (Wenzhou), China
 Maldegem, Belgium
 Świdnica (rural gmina), Poland

Étampes
 Borna, Germany

Étaples

 Folkestone, England, United Kingdom
 Hückeswagen, Germany

Évreux

 Djougou, Benin
 Kashira, Russia
 Rugby, England, United Kingdom
 Rüsselsheim am Main, Germany

Évry-Courcouronnes

 Bexley, England, United Kingdom
 Nowy Targ, Poland
 Troisdorf, Germany

Eysines

 Castrillón, Spain
 Clonmel, Ireland
 Onești, Romania
 Sonnino, Italy

F
Faches-Thumesnil

 Cattolica, Italy
 St Neots, England, United Kingdom
 Stolberg, Germany
 Tinkaré, Mali

Fécamp

 Mouscron, Belgium
 Putnok, Hungary
 Rheinfelden, Germany
 Vale of Glamorgan, Wales, United Kingdom

Fleury-les-Aubrais

 Formia, Italy
 Gračanica, Bosnia and Herzegovina

Fontainebleau

 Konstanz, Germany
 Lodi, Italy
 Richmond upon Thames, England, United Kingdom
 Sintra, Portugal

Fontenay-aux-Roses

 Elstree and Borehamwood, England, United Kingdom
 Wiesloch, Germany
 Ząbkowice Śląskie, Poland

Fontenay-le-Comte

 Crevillent, Spain
 Diosig, Romania
 Gaoua, Burkina Faso
 Krotoszyn, Poland
 Palatine, United States

Fontenay-sous-Bois

 Brovary, Ukraine
 Etterbeek, Belgium
 Koungheul, Senegal
 Marinha Grande, Portugal
 Pianello Val Tidone, Italy

Forbach

 Ravanusa, Italy
 Tanguiéta, Benin
 Târgu Jiu, Romania
 Völklingen, Germany

Fougères

 Ashford, England, United Kingdom
 Bad Münstereifel, Germany
 Ouargaye, Burkina Faso
 Somoto, Nicaragua

Fourmies

 Bernburg, Germany
 Fridley, United States

Franconville

 Potters Bar, England, United Kingdom
 Viernheim, Germany

Fréjus

 Dumbéa, New Caledonia
 Fredericksburg, United States
 Paola, Italy
 Tabarka, Tunisia
 Triberg im Schwarzwald, Germany

Fresnes
 Homberg, Germany

Frontignan

 Gaeta, Italy
 M'diq, Morocco
 Pineda de Mar, Spain
 Vizela, Portugal

G
Gagny

 Apeldoorn, Netherlands
 Barberino Tavarnelle, Italy
 Charlottenburg-Wilmersdorf (Berlin), Germany
 Gladsaxe, Denmark
 Minden, Germany
 Sutton, England, United Kingdom

Gaillac

 Caspe, Spain
 Santa Maria a Vico, Italy

Gap

 Pinerolo, Italy
 Traunstein, Germany

La Garde

 Montesarchio, Italy
 Spa, Belgium

La Garenne-Colombes

 Harissa-Daraoun, Lebanon
 Valpaços, Portugal
 Wangen im Allgäu, Germany
 Yokneam Illit, Israel

Gennevilliers

 La Bañeza, Spain
 Bergkamen, Germany
 Al-Bireh, Palestine
 Imola, Italy
 Ostrowiec Świętokrzyski, Poland
 Wirral, England, United Kingdom

Gentilly
 Freiberg, Germany

Givors

 Aïn Bénian, Algeria
 Döbeln, Germany
 Gavinane, Mali
 Novopolotsk, Belarus
 Orvieto, Italy
 Vila Nova de Famalicão, Portugal

Gonesse
 Leonessa, Italy

Grande-Synthe
 Suwałki, Poland

Le Grand-Quevilly

 Hinckley, England, United Kingdom
 Laatzen, Germany
 Lévis, Canada
 Morondava, Madagascar
 Ness Ziona, Israel

Granville is a member of the Douzelage, a town twinning association of towns across the European Union, alongside with:

 Agros, Cyprus
 Altea, Spain
 Asikkala, Finland
 Bad Kötzting, Germany
 Bellagio, Italy
 Bundoran, Ireland
 Chojna, Poland
 Holstebro, Denmark
 Houffalize, Belgium
 Judenburg, Austria
 Kőszeg, Hungary
 Marsaskala, Malta
 Meerssen, Netherlands
 Niederanven, Luxembourg
 Oxelösund, Sweden
 Preveza, Greece
 Rokiškis, Lithuania
 Rovinj, Croatia
 Sesimbra, Portugal
 Sherborne, England, United Kingdom
 Sigulda, Latvia
 Siret, Romania
 Škofja Loka, Slovenia
 Sušice, Czech Republic
 Tryavna, Bulgaria
 Türi, Estonia
 Zvolen, Slovakia

Grasse

 Carrara, Italy
 Ingolstadt, Germany
 Kazanlak, Bulgaria
 Marblehead, United States
 Murcia, Spain
 Opole, Poland
 Pardes Hanna-Karkur, Israel
 Vila Real, Portugal

Gravelines

 Biblis, Germany
 Dartford, England, United Kingdom
 Fjarðabyggð, Iceland

Grenoble

 Bethlehem, Palestine
 Catania, Italy
 Chişinău, Moldova
 Constantine, Algeria
 Corato, Italy
 Essen, Germany
 Halle, Germany
 Innsbruck, Austria
 Kaunas, Lithuania
 Oxford, England, United Kingdom
 Ouagadougou, Burkina Faso
 Oujda, Morocco
 Phoenix, United States
 Rehovot, Israel
 Sevan, Armenia
 Sfax, Tunisia
 Stendal, Germany
 Suzhou, China
 Tsukuba, Japan

Grigny
 Wettenberg, Germany

Guérande

 Almagro, Spain
 Castro Marim, Portugal
 Dinkelsbühl, Germany
 Dolgellau, Wales, United Kingdom

Guidel

 Carrigaline, Ireland
 Negrești-Oaș, Romania
 Pulheim, Germany

Gujan-Mestras
 Santa María de Cayón, Spain

Guyancourt

 Comè, Benin
 Linlithgow, Scotland, United Kingdom
 Pegnitz, Germany

H
Haguenau
 Landau in der Pfalz, Germany

Halluin

 Kočevje, Slovenia
 Lübbenau, Germany
 Menen, Belgium
 North Tyneside, England, United Kingdom
 Oer-Erkenschwick, Germany
 Pniewy, Poland
 Zulte, Belgium

Harnes

 Chrzanów, Poland
 Falkenstein, Germany
 Kabouda, Burkina Faso
 Loanhead, Scotland, United Kingdom
 Vendres, France

Hautmont

 Halver, Germany
 Kalisz, Poland

Le Havre

 Dalian, China
 Magdeburg, Germany
 Saint Petersburg, Russia
 Southampton, England, United Kingdom
 Tampa, United States

Hayange

 Barga, Italy
 Diekirch, Luxembourg 

L'Haÿ-les-Roses
 Bad Hersfeld, Germany

Hazebrouck

 Faversham, England, United Kingdom
 Porz (Cologne), Germany
 Soignies, Belgium

Hem

 Aljustrel, Portugal
 Mossley, England, United Kingdom
 Wiehl, Germany

Hendaye

 Arguedas, Spain
 Peebles, Scotland, United Kingdom
 Viana do Castelo, Portugal

Hénin-Beaumont

 Herne, Germany
 Konin, Poland
 Rolling Meadows, United States
 Rufisque, Senegal
 Wakefield, England, United Kingdom

Hennebont

 Halhul, Palestine
 Kronach, Germany
 Mourdiah, Mali
 Mumbles, Wales, United Kingdom

Les Herbiers

 Coria, Spain
 Liebertwolkwitz (Leipzig), Germany
 Newtown, Wales, United Kingdom

Herblay-sur-Seine

 Taunusstein, Germany
 Yeovil, England, United Kingdom

Hérouville-Saint-Clair

 Ahfir, Morocco
 Agnam-Goly, Senegal
 Garbsen, Germany
 Tikhvin, Russia

Honfleur

 Burlington, United States
 Plyos, Russia
 Sandwich, England, United Kingdom
 Visé, Belgium
 Wörth am Main, Germany

Houilles

 Celorico de Basto, Portugal
 Chesham, England, United Kingdom
 Friedrichsdorf, Germany
 Schœlcher, Martinique, France

Hyères

 Koekelberg, Belgium
 Rottweil, Germany

I
L'Isle-sur-la-Sorgue

 Anagni, Italy
 Penicuik, Scotland, United Kingdom

Issoire

 Mont-Laurier, Canada
 Neumarkt in der Oberpfalz, Germany

Issy-les-Moulineaux

 Dapaong, Togo
 Dongcheng (Beijing), China
 Frameries, Belgium
 Guro (Seoul), South Korea
 Hounslow, England, United Kingdom
 Ichikawa, Japan

 Macerata, Italy
 Nahariya, Israel

 Pozuelo de Alarcón, Spain
 Vagharshapat, Armenia
 Weiden in der Oberpfalz, Germany

Istres
 Radolfzell, Germany

Ivry-sur-Seine

 Brandenburg an der Havel, Germany
 Dianguirdé, Mali
 Jifna, Palestine
 La Lisa (Havana), Cuba

J
Jaunay-Marigny

 Cavan, Ireland
 Oleśnica, Poland
 Péruwelz, Belgium

Joigny

 Amelia, Italy
 Godalming, England, United Kingdom
 Hanover, United States
 Joigny-sur-Meuse, France
 Kilibo, Benin
 Mayen, Germany

Joinville-le-Pont

 Batalha, Portugal
 Bergisch Gladbach, Germany
 Joinville, Brazil
 Runnymede, England, United Kingdom

Joué-lès-Tours

 Città di Castello, Italy
 East Ayrshire, Scotland, United Kingdom
 Hechingen, Germany
 Ogre, Latvia
 Santa Maria da Feira, Portugal

K
Kingersheim
 Tübingen, Germany 
 
Kourou

 Cordes-sur-Ciel, France
 Macapá, Brazil

L
Lagny-sur-Marne

 Alnwick, England, United Kingdom
 Haslach im Kinzigtal, Germany
 Mira, Portugal
 Sainte-Agathe-des-Monts, Canada

Lambersart

 Southborough, England, United Kingdom
 Viersen, Germany

Le Lamentin
 Santiago de Cuba, Cuba

Landerneau

 Bam Province, Burkina Faso
 Caernarfon, Wales, United Kingdom
 Hünfeld, Germany
 Mioveni, Romania

Laon

 Soltau, Germany
 Winchester, England, United Kingdom

Laval

 Boston, England, United Kingdom
 Chalkidiki, Greece
 Gandia, Spain
 Garango, Burkina Faso
 Laval, Canada
 Lovech, Bulgaria
 Mettmann, Germany
 Modesto, United States
 Suceava, Romania

Levallois-Perret
 Tempelhof-Schöneberg (Berlin), Germany

Libourne

 Keynsham, England, United Kingdom
 Logroño, Spain
 Schwandorf, Germany

Liévin

 Bruck an der Mur, Austria
 Hagen, Germany

 Pasvalys, Lithuania
 Roccastrada, Italy
 Rybnik, Poland
 La Valette-du-Var, France

Les Lilas
 Völklingen, Germany

Lille

 Cologne, Germany
 Erfurt, Germany
 Esch-sur-Alzette, Luxembourg

 Kharkiv, Ukraine
 Leeds, England, United Kingdom
 Liège, Belgium
 Nablus, Palestine
 Oujda, Morocco
 Rotterdam, Netherlands
 Saint-Louis, Senegal
 Tlemcen, Algeria
 Turin, Italy
 Valladolid, Spain
 Wrocław, Poland

Limoges

 Charlotte, United States
 Fürth, Germany
 Grodno, Belarus
 Icheon, South Korea
 Plzeň, Czech Republic
 Seto, Japan

Livry-Gargan

 Almuñécar, Spain
 Cerveteri, Italy
 Fürstenfeldbruck, Germany
 Haringey, England, United Kingdom

Longjumeau

 Bretten, Germany
 Condeixa-a-Nova, Portugal
 Pontypool, Wales, United Kingdom

Longwy

 Differdange, Luxembourg
 Nagold, Germany

Lorient

 České Budějovice, Czech Republic
 Galway, Ireland
 Ludwigshafen, Germany
 Ventspils, Latvia
 Vigo, Spain
 Wirral, England, United Kingdom

Lourdes

 Bethlehem, Palestine
 Częstochowa, Poland
 Ourém, Portugal

Louviers

 Holzwickede, Germany
 Isle of Portland, England, United Kingdom
 San Vito dei Normanni, Italy
 Weymouth, England, United Kingdom

Ludres

 Domažlice, Czech Republic
 Furth bei Göttweig, Austria
 Furth im Wald, Germany

Lunéville
 Schwetzingen, Germany

Lyon

 Addis Ababa, Ethiopia
 Beersheba, Israel
 Birmingham, England, United Kingdom
 Frankfurt am Main, Germany
 Gothenburg, Sweden
 Guangzhou, China
 Ho Chi Minh City, Vietnam
 Leipzig, Germany
 Łódź, Poland
 Milan, Italy
 Montreal, Canada
 Ouagadougou, Burkina Faso
 Porto-Novo, Benin
 Rabat, Morocco
 Sétif, Algeria
 St. Louis, United States
 Tinca, Romania
 Yokohama, Japan

M

Ma
Mâcon

 Alcázar de San Juan, Spain
 Crewe, England, United Kingdom
 Eger, Hungary
 Lecco, Italy
 Macon, United States
 Nantwich, England, United Kingdom
 Neustadt an der Weinstraße, Germany
 Overijse, Belgium
 Pori, Finland
 Santo Tirso, Portugal

Maisons-Alfort
 Moers, Germany

Maisons-Laffitte

 Newmarket, England, United Kingdom
 Remagen, Germany

Malakoff
 Corsico, Italy

Mandelieu-la-Napoule

 Crans-Montana, Switzerland
 Ottobrunn, Germany

Manosque

 Leinfelden-Echterdingen, Germany
 Voghera, Italy

Le Mans

 Bolton, England, United Kingdom
 Haouza, Western Sahara
 Paderborn, Germany
 Rostov-on-Don, Russia
 Suzuka, Japan
 Volos, Greece
 Xianyang, China

Mantes-la-Jolie

 Hillingdon, England, United Kingdom
 Maia, Portugal
 Schleswig, Germany

Marcq-en-Barœul

 Ealing, England, United Kingdom
 Gladbeck, Germany
 Kuurne, Belgium
 Poggibonsi, Italy

Marignane

 Figueres, Spain
 Göd, Hungary
 Ravanusa, Italy
 Slănic, Romania
 Wolfsburg, Germany

Marly-le-Roi

 Kita, Mali
 Leichlingen, Germany
 Marlow, England, United Kingdom
 Viseu, Portugal

Marseille

 Abidjan, Ivory Coast
 Antwerp, Belgium
 Copenhagen, Denmark
 Dakar, Senegal
 Genoa, Italy
 Glasgow, Scotland, United Kingdom
 Haifa, Israel
 Hamburg, Germany
 Kobe, Japan
 Marrakesh, Morocco
 Odesa, Ukraine
 Piraeus, Greece
 Shanghai, China
 Tunis, Tunisia
 Yerevan, Armenia

Massy
 Ascoli Piceno, Italy

Maubeuge

 Ouarzazate, Morocco
 Ratingen, Germany
 Vilvoorde, Belgium

Mauges-sur-Loire
 Tihany, Hungary

Mauguio

 Anchawadi, Mali
 Boves, Italy
 Lorca, Spain
 Midoun, Tunisia
 Păușești-Măglași, Romania

Maurepas

 Henstedt-Ulzburg, Germany
 Tirat Carmel, Israel
 Usedom, Germany
 Waterlooville, England, United Kingdom

Mayenne

 Devizes, England, United Kingdom
 Jesi, Italy
 Waiblingen, Germany

Me–Mi
Meaux

 Basildon, England, United Kingdom
 Heiligenhaus, Germany

Melun

 Crema, Italy
 Spelthorne, England, United Kingdom
 Vaihingen (Stuttgart), Germany

Mende

 Vila Real, Portugal
 Volterra, Italy
 Wunsiedel, Germany

Menton

 Baden-Baden, Germany
 Laguna Beach, United States
 Montreux, Switzerland

 Nafplio, Greece
 Sochi, Russia

Mérignac

 Kaolack, Senegal
 Saint-Laurent (Montreal), Canada
 Vilanova i la Geltrú, Spain

Metz

 Blida, Algeria
 Gloucester, England, United Kingdom
 Hradec Králové, Czech Republic
 Karmiel, Israel
 Luxembourg, Luxembourg
 Saint-Denis, Réunion, France
 Tangier, Morocco
 Trier, Germany

Meudon

 Brezno, Slovakia
 Celle, Germany
 Ciechanów, Poland
 Mazkeret Batya, Israel
 Rushmoor, England, United Kingdom
 Woluwe-Saint-Lambert, Belgium

Meulan-en-Yvelines

 Arraiolos, Portugal
 Kilsyth, Scotland, United Kingdom
 Taufkirchen, Germany

Meylan

 Didcot, England, United Kingdom
 Gonzales, United States
 Planegg, Germany

Millau

 Bad Salzuflen, Germany
 Bridlington, England, United Kingdom
 Louga, Senegal
 Mealhada, Portugal
 Plopeni, Romania
 Sagunto, Spain

Mo–Mu
Montargis

 Crowborough, England, United Kingdom
 Greven, Germany

Montbéliard
 Ludwigsburg, Germany

Montbrison

 Eichstätt, Germany
 Sežana, Slovenia

Montélimar

 Mollet del Vallès, Spain
 Nabeul, Tunisia
 Racine, United States
 Ravensburg, Germany
 Rhondda Cynon Taf, Wales, United Kingdom
 Rivoli, Italy
 Sisian, Armenia

Montereau-Fault-Yonne

 Aydın, Turkey
 Chishui, China
 Otley, England, United Kingdom
 Paredes, Portugal
 Safi, Morocco
 Walldürn, Germany

Montesson

 Baesweiler, Germany
 Thame, England, United Kingdom

Montgeron

 Eschborn, Germany
 Póvoa de Varzim, Portugal

Montigny-en-Gohelle

 Stollberg, Germany
 Tamási, Hungary

Montigny-le-Bretonneux

 Denton, England, United Kingdom
 Kierspe, Germany
 Lunca, Romania
 Marostica, Italy
 San Fernando,  Spain
 Wicklow, Ireland

Montivilliers

 Nasséré, Burkina Faso
 Nordhorn, Germany

Montluçon

 Antsirabe, Madagascar
 Guimarães, Portugal
 Hagen, Germany
 Igualada, Spain
 Leszno, Poland

Montmorency

 Kehl, Germany
 Knutsford, England, United Kingdom
 Pułtusk, Poland

Montpellier

 Barcelona, Spain
 Bethlehem, Palestine
 Chengdu, China
 Fez, Morocco
 Heidelberg, Germany
 Kos, Greece
 Louisville, United States
 Obninsk, Russia
 Palermo, Italy
 Rio de Janeiro, Brazil
 Sherbrooke, Canada
 Tiberias, Israel
 Tlemcen, Algeria

Montreuil

 Cottbus, Germany

Mont-de-Marsan

 Alingsås, Sweden
 Tudela, Spain

Mont-Saint-Aignan

 Barsinghausen, Germany
 Brzeg Dolny, Poland
 Edenbridge, England
 Osica de Sus, Romania
 Rouko, Burkina Faso

Morlaix

 Alexandria, Romania
 Réo, Burkina Faso
 Truro, England, United Kingdom
 Würselen, Germany

Moulins

 Bad Vilbel, Germany
 Montepulciano, Italy

Mouvaux

 Buckingham, England, United Kingdom
 Halle, Belgium
 Neukirchen-Vluyn, Germany

Mulhouse

 Antwerp, Belgium
 Bergamo, Italy
 Chemnitz, Germany
 Givatayim, Israel
 Jining, China
 Kassel, Germany
 Timișoara, Romania
 Walsall, England, United Kingdom

Les Mureaux

 Idar-Oberstein, Germany
 Margate, England, United Kingdom
 Nonantola, Italy
 Sosnowiec, Poland

Muret
 Monzón, Spain

N
Nancy

 Cincinnati, United States
 Karlsruhe, Germany
 Kanazawa, Japan
 Kiryat Shmona, Israel
 Krasnodar, Russia
 Kunming, China
 Newcastle upon Tyne, England, United Kingdom
 Liège, Belgium
 Lublin, Poland
 Padua, Italy

Nanterre

 Craiova, Romania
 Pesaro, Italy
 Tlemcen, Algeria
 Veliky Novgorod, Russia
 Watford, England, United Kingdom
 Žilina, Slovakia

Nantes

 Cardiff, Wales, United Kingdom
 Cluj-Napoca, Romania
 Jacksonville, United States
 Niigata, Japan
 Qingdao, China
 Saarbrücken, Germany
 Seattle, United States
 Suncheon, South Korea
 Tbilisi, Georgia

Nemours

 Mühltal, Germany
 Wilmington, United States

Neuilly-Plaisance
 Montgomery, United States

Neuilly-sur-Seine

 Uccle, Belgium
 Windsor and Maidenhead, England, United Kingdom

Nevers

 Charleville-Mézières, France
 Curtea de Argeș, Romania
 Erzsébetváros (Budapest), Hungary
 Hammamet, Tunisia
 Koblenz, Germany
 Lund, Sweden
 Mantua, Italy
 Neubrandenburg, Germany

 St Albans, England, United Kingdom
 Stavroupoli, Greece
 Taizhou, China

Nice

 Abidjan, Ivory Coast
 Alicante, Spain
 Antananarivo, Madagascar
 Astana, Kazakhstan

 Cuneo, Italy
 Edinburgh, Scotland, United Kingdom
 Gdańsk, Poland
 Hangzhou, China
 Houston, United States
 Kamakura, Japan
 Laval, Canada
 Libreville, Gabon
 Locarno, Switzerland
 Manila, Philippines
 Miami, United States
 Netanya, Israel
 New Orleans, United States
 Nouméa, New Caledonia
 Nuremberg, Germany
 Ouagadougou, Burkina Faso
 Papeete, French Polynesia
 Phuket, Thailand
 Rio de Janeiro, Brazil
 Saint Petersburg, Russia
 Santa Cruz de Tenerife, Spain
 Sorrento, Italy
 Sousse, Tunisia
 Szeged, Hungary
 Thessaloniki, Greece
 Xiamen, China
 Yalta, Ukraine
 Yerevan, Armenia

Nîmes

 Braunschweig, Germany
 Córdoba, Spain
 Fort Worth, United States
 Frankfurt an der Oder, Germany
 Meknes, Morocco
 Prague 1 (Prague), Czech Republic
 Preston, England, United Kingdom
 Rishon LeZion, Israel
 Verona, Italy

Niort

 Atakpamé, Togo
 Coburg, Germany
 Cové, Benin
 Gijón, Spain
 Springe, Germany
 Tomelloso, Spain
 Wellingborough, England, United Kingdom

Nogent-sur-Marne

 Bolesławiec, Poland
 Nazaré, Portugal
 Siegburg, Germany
 Val Nure, Italy
 Yverdon-les-Bains, Switzerland

Nogent-sur-Oise

 Aida Camp, Palestine
 Beverley, England, United Kingdom
 Fucecchio, Italy
 Gersthofen, Germany

Noisy-le-Roi

 Albion, United States
 Godella, Spain

Noisy-le-Sec

 Arganda del Rey, Spain
 Djeol, Mauritania
 South Tyneside, England, United Kingdom

O
Olivet

 Bad Oldesloe, Germany
 Fakenham, England, United Kingdom

Orange

 Breda, Netherlands
 Byblos, Lebanon
 Diest, Belgium
 Dillenburg, Germany
 Jarosław, Poland
 Kielce, Poland
 Rastatt, Germany
 Spoleto, Italy
 Vélez-Rubio, Spain
 Weifang, China

Orchies
 Kelso, Scotland, United Kingdom

Orléans

 Dundee, Scotland, United Kingdom
 Kraków, Poland
 Kristiansand, Norway
 Lugoj, Romania
 Münster, Germany
 New Orleans, United States
 Saint-Flour, France
 Tarragona, Spain
 Treviso, Italy
 Utsunomiya, Japan
 Wichita, United States
 Yangzhou, China

Orly

 Campi Bisenzio, Italy
 Drobeta-Turnu Severin, Romania
 Klin, Russia
 Pointe-à-Pitre, Guadeloupe, France

Orsay

 Dogondoutchi, Niger
 Kempen, Germany
 Vila Nova de Paiva, Portugal

Orvault

 Heusweiler, Germany
 Tredegar, Wales, United Kingdom

Oullins

 Nürtingen, Germany
 Pescia, Italy

Oyonnax

 Carpi, Italy
 Eislingen, Germany

P

Pa–Pe
Palaiseau
 Unna, Germany

Pantin

 Meshchansky (Moscow), Russia
 Scandicci, Italy

Paris
 Rome, Italy

Parthenay

 Abrantes, Portugal
 Arnedo, Spain
 Edmundston, Canada
 Manakara, Madagaskar
 Tipperary, Ireland
 Tsévié, Togo
 Weinstadt, Germany

Pau

 Daloa, Ivory Coast
 Göttingen, Germany
 Kōfu, Japan

 Pistoia, Italy
 Setúbal, Portugal
 Swansea, Wales, United Kingdom
 Xi'an, China
 Zaragoza, Spain

Les Pavillons-sous-Bois

 Brackley, England, United Kingdom
 Bragança, Portugal
 Écija, Spain
 Münstermaifeld, Germany

Le Pecq

 Aranjuez, Spain
 Barnes, England, United Kingdom
 Hennef, Germany

Périgueux
 Amberg, Germany

Perpignan

 Berkane, Morocco
 Hanover, Germany
 Lancaster, England, United Kingdom
 Lleida, Spain
 Ma'alot-Tarshiha, Israel
 Sarasota, United States
 Tavira, Portugal

Le Perreux-sur-Marne
 Forchheim, Germany

Pertuis

 Alton, England, United Kingdom
 Este, Italy
 Herborn, Germany
 Utiel, Spain

Pessac

 Banfora, Burkina Faso
 Burgos, Spain
 Galați, Romania
 Göppingen, Germany
 Viana do Castelo, Portugal

Pl–Pu
Plaisance-du-Touch

 Carnate, Italy
 Lingfield, England, United Kingdom
 Utebo, Spain

Plaisir

 Bad Aussee, Austria
 Geesthacht, Germany
 Lowestoft, England, United Kingdom
 Moita, Portugal

Plérin

 Cookstown, Northern Ireland, United Kingdom
 Herzogenrath, Germany
 Wronki, Poland

Le Plessis-Robinson

 Woking, England, United Kingdom

Le Plessis-Trévise

 Burladingen, Germany
 Ourém, Portugal
 Sparta, Greece
 Wągrowiec, Poland

Ploemeur

 Diksmuide, Belgium
 Ehmej, Lebanon
 Fermoy, Ireland

Ploërmel

 Apensen, Germany
 Cobh, Ireland
 Dabola, Guinea
 Gorseinon, Wales, United Kingdom
 Kolbuszowa, Portugal
 Llwchwr, Wales, United Kingdom

Plouzané

 Ceccano, Italy
 Kilrush, Ireland
 Pencoed, Wales, United Kingdom
 Stelle, Germany

Poissy
 Pirmasens, Germany

Poitiers

 Coimbra, Portugal
 Iaşi, Romania
 Lafayette, United States
 Northampton, England, United Kingdom
 Marburg, Germany
 Moundou, Chad
 Yaroslavl, Russia

Pontault-Combault

 Anyama, Ivory Coast
 Beilstein, Germany
 Caminha, Portugal
 Rădăuți, Romania

Pontivy

 Napoleonville, United States
 Tavistock, England, United Kingdom
 Wesseling, Germany

Pontoise

 Arenzano, Italy
 Böblingen, Germany
 Columbia, United States

 Sevenoaks, England, United Kingdom
 Sittard-Geleen, Netherlands
 West Lancashire, England, United Kingdom

Pont-Sainte-Maxence

 Felgueiras, Portugal
 Grignasco, Italy
 Linguère, Senegal
 Sambreville, Belgium
 Sulzbach, Germany

La Possession

 Foshan, China
 Mamoudzou, Mayotte
 Port Louis, Mauritius
 Victoria, Seychelles
 Villeneuve-d'Ascq, France

Puteaux

 Braga, Portugal
 Esch-sur-Alzette, Luxembourg
 Gan Yavne, Israel
 Kati, Mali
 Mödling, Austria
 Offenbach am Main, Germany
 Opočno, Czech Republic
 Tangier, Morocco
 Velletri, Italy
 Zemun (Belgrade), Serbia

Le Puy-en-Velay

 Brugherio, Italy
 Mangualde, Portugal
 Meschede, Germany
 Tonbridge and Malling, England, United Kingdom
 Tortosa, Spain

Q
Le Quesnoy

 Dej, Romania
 Cambridge (Waipa), New Zealand
 Morlanwelz, Belgium
 Ratingen, Germany

Quimper

 Foggia, Italy
 Laurium, Greece
 Limerick, Ireland
 Ourense, Spain
 Remscheid, Germany
 Yantai, China

Quimperlé

 Athenry, Ireland
 Geilenkirchen, Germany
 Liskeard, England, United Kingdom
 Nara, Mali

Quincy-sous-Sénart

 Montemarciano, Italy
 Saue, Estonia

Quint-Fonsegrives
 Leiria, Portugal

R

Ra–Ri
Le Raincy

 Barnet, England, United Kingdom
 Caldas da Rainha, Portugal
 Clusone, Italy
 Yavne, Israel

Rambouillet

 Great Yarmouth, England, United Kingdom
 Kirchheim unter Teck, Germany
 Torres Novas, Portugal
 Waterloo, Belgium
 Zafra, Spain

Ramonville-Saint-Agne

 Karben, Germany
 Zuera, Spain

Reims

 Aachen, Germany
 Arlington County, United States
 Brazzaville, Congo
 Canterbury, England, United Kingdom
 Florence, Italy
 Kutná Hora, Czech Republic
 Nagoya, Japan
 Salzburg, Austria

Rennes

 Almaty, Kazakhstan
 Bandiagara Cercle, Mali
 Brno, Czech Republic
 Cork, Ireland
 Erlangen, Germany
 Exeter, England, United Kingdom
 Jinan, China
 Poznań, Poland
 Rochester, United States
 Sendai, Japan
 Sétif, Algeria
 Sibiu, Romania

Rillieux-la-Pape

 Ditzingen, Germany
 Łęczyca, Poland
 Natitingou, Benin

Riom

 Adur, England, United Kingdom
 Algemesí, Spain
 Nördlingen, Germany
 Viana do Castelo, Portugal
 Żywiec, Poland

Riorges

 Calasparra, Spain
 Donzdorf, Germany
 Elland, England, United Kingdom
 Piatra Neamț, Romania

Rive-de-Gier

 Alessandria della Rocca, Italy
 Bivona, Italy
 Cianciana, Italy
 Kysucké Nové Mesto, Slovakia
 San Biagio Platani, Italy
 Santo Stefano Quisquina, Italy

Rixheim

 Lohne, Germany
 San Vito al Tagliamento, Italy

Ro–Ru
Roanne

 Guadalajara, Spain
 Legnica, Poland
 Montevarchi, Italy
 Nuneaton and Bedworth, England, United Kingdom
 Piatra Neamț, Romania
 Reutlingen, Germany

Rochefort

 Papenburg, Germany
 Torrelavega, Spain

La Rochelle

 Acre, Israel
 Essaouira, Morocco
 Figueiró (Amarante), Portugal
 Lübeck, Germany
 New Rochelle, United States
 Petrozavodsk, Russia

La Roche-sur-Yon

 Burg, Germany
 Cáceres, Spain
 Coleraine, Northern Ireland, United Kingdom
 Drummondville, Canada
 Gummersbach, Germany
 Tizi Ouzou, Algeria

Rodez
 Bamberg, Germany

Roissy-en-Brie

 Abergele, Wales, United Kingdom
 Barmstedt, Germany
 Colwyn Bay, Wales, United Kingdom

Romans-sur-Isère

 Coalville, England, United Kingdom
 Corsano, Italy
 Straubing, Germany
 Varese, Italy
 Zadar, Croatia
 Zlín, Czech Republic

Romilly-sur-Seine

 Milford Haven, England, United Kingdom
 Gotha, Germany
 Lüdenscheid, Germany
 Medicina, Italy
 Uman, Ukraine

Romorantin-Lanthenay

 Aranda de Duero, Spain
 Langen, Germany
 Long Eaton, England, United Kingdom
 Mudanya, Turkey

Ronchin

 Halle, Germany
 Kirkby-in-Ashfield, England, United Kingdom
 Târnăveni, Romania

Rosny-sous-Bois

 Cotonou, Benin
 Übach-Palenberg, Germany
 Yanzhou (Jining), China

Roubaix

 Bradford, England, United Kingdom
 Covilhã, Portugal
 Mönchengladbach, Germany
 Prato, Italy
 Skopje, North Macedonia
 Sosnowiec, Poland
 Verviers, Belgium

Rouen

 Cleveland, United States
 Hanover, Germany
 Jeju City, South Korea
 Ningbo, China
 Norwich, England, United Kingdom
 Salerno, Italy

Royan

 Annapolis Royal, Canada
 Balingen, Germany
 Gosport, England, United Kingdom

Rueil-Malmaison

 Ávila, Spain
 Bad Soden, Germany
 Le Bardo, Tunisia
 Bukhara, Uzbekistan
 Dubrovnik, Croatia
 Elmbridge, England, United Kingdom
 Fribourg, Switzerland
 Helsingør, Denmark
 Jelgava, Latvia
 Kiryat Malakhi, Israel
 Kitzbühel, Austria
 Lynchburg, United States
 Oaxaca de Juárez, Mexico

 Sergiyev Posad, Russia
 Timișoara, Romania
 Tōgane, Japan
 Zouk Mikael, Lebanon

Ruelle-sur-Touvre

 Albaida, Spain
 Amstetten, Austria
 Banbridge, Northern Ireland, United Kingdom
 Roudnice nad Labem, Czech Republic

Rumilly

 Maglie, Italy
 Michelstadt, Germany

S

Sa
Les Sables-d'Olonne

 Gourcy, Burkina Faso
 A Laracha, Spain
 Murat, France
 Schwabach, Germany
 Worthing, England, United Kingdom

Saintes

 Cuevas del Almanzora, Spain
 Nivelles, Belgium
 Salisbury, England, United Kingdom
 Timbuktu, Mali
 Vladimir, Russia
 Xanten, Germany

Sainte-Foy-lès-Lyon

 Lichfield, England, United Kingdom
 Limburg an der Lahn, Germany

Sainte-Geneviève-des-Bois

 Mikołów, Poland
 Obertshausen, Germany
 Penafiel, Portugal

Saint-André-lez-Lille

 Dormagen, Germany
 St Mary's Bay, England, United Kingdom
 Wieliczka, Poland

Saint-Avertin
 Steinbach, Germany

Saint-Brice-sous-Forêt
 Devínska Nová Ves (Bratislava), Slovakia

Saint-Brieuc

 Aberystwyth, Wales, United Kingdom
 Agia Paraskevi, Greece
 Alsdorf, Germany

Saint-Chamond
 Grevenbroich, Germany

Saint-Cloud

 Bad Godesberg (Bonn), Germany
 Boadilla del Monte, Spain
 Frascati, Italy
 Kortrijk, Belgium
 St. Cloud, Florida, United States
 St. Cloud, Minnesota, United States
 Windsor and Maidenhead, England, United Kingdom

Saint-Cyr-l'École

 Bonnyrigg, Scotland, United Kingdom
 Butzbach, Germany
 Lasswade, Scotland, United Kingdom

Saint-Cyr-sur-Loire

 Koussanar, Senegal
 Meinerzhagen, Germany
 Morphou, Cyprus
 Newark-on-Trent, England, United Kingdom
 Ptuj, Slovenia

Saint-Denis

 Coatbridge, Scotland, United Kingdom
 Djélébou, Mali
 Gera, Germany
 Karakoro, Mali
 Santa Catarina, Cape Verde
 Sesto San Giovanni, Italy
 Tiznit, Morocco
 Tuzla, Bosnia and Herzegovina

Saint-Dié-des-Vosges

 Arlon, Belgium
 Cattolica, Italy
 Crikvenica, Croatia
 Friedrichshafen, Germany
 Lorraine, Canada
 Lowell, United States
 Meckhe, Senegal
 Zakopane, Poland

Saint-Égrève

 Karben, Germany
 Krnov, Czech Republic
 Mińsk Mazowiecki, Poland
 Telšiai, Lithuania

Saint-Étienne

 Ben Arous, Tunisia
 Coventry, England, United Kingdom
 Des Moines, United States
 Ferrara, Italy
 Geltendorf, Germany
 Katowice, Poland
 Luhansk, Ukraine
 Monastir, Tunisia
 Nof HaGalil, Israel
 Oeiras, Portugal
 Patras, Greece

 Tamatave, Madagascar
 Windsor, Canada
 Wuppertal, Germany
 Xuzhou, China

Saint-Étienne-du-Rouvray

 Gateshead, England, United Kingdom
 Nordenham, Germany
 Nova Kakhovka, Ukraine

Saint-Genis-Laval

 Cirencester, England, United Kingdom 
 Pontassieve, Italy
 Săliște, Romania

Saint-Germain-en-Laye

 Aschaffenburg, Germany
 Ayr, Scotland, United Kingdom
 Konstancin-Jeziorna, Poland
 Schwelm, Germany
 Winchester, United States

Saint-Herblain

 Cleja, Romania
 Kazanlak, Bulgaria
 N'Diaganiao, Senegal
 Sankt Ingbert, Germany
 Viladecans, Spain
 Waterford, Ireland

Saint-Jean-de-Braye

 Boussouma, Burkina Faso
 March, England, United Kingdom
 Pfullendorf, Germany

Saint-Jean-de-la-Ruelle

 Amposta, Spain
 Gommern, Germany
 Niepołomice, Poland

Saint-Junien

 Charleroi, Belgium
 Wendelstein, Germany
 Żukowo, Poland

Saint-Laurent-du-Maroni

 Saint-Joseph, Martinique, France
 Saint-Martin-de-Ré, France

Saint-Laurent-du-Var

 Landsberg am Lech, Germany
 Siófok, Hungary

Saint-Lô

 Aalen, Germany
 Christchurch, England, United Kingdom
 Roanoke, United States
 Saint-Ghislain, Belgium

Saint-Mandé

 Concord, United States
 Drogheda, Ireland
 Eschwege, Germany
 Tres Cantos, Spain
 Vila Verde, Portugal
 Waltham Forest, England, United Kingdom
 Yanggu, South Korea 

Saint-Maur-des-Fossés

 Bognor Regis, England, United Kingdom
 Hamelin, Germany
 Leiria, Portugal
 La Louvière, Belgium
 Pforzheim, Germany
 Ramat HaSharon, Israel
 Rimini, Italy
 Ziguinchor, Senegal

Saint-Médard-en-Jalles

 Almansa, Spain
 Merzig, Germany
 Sabaudia, Italy

Saint-Michel-sur-Orge

 Fresagrandinaria, Italy
 Nowa Sól, Poland
 Püttlingen, Germany
 Veszprém, Hungary
 Žamberk, Czech Republic

Saint-Nazaire

 Avilés, Spain
 Saarlouis, Germany
 Sunderland, England, United Kingdom

Saint-Ouen-sur-Seine

 Podolsk, Russia
 Ruse, Bulgaria
 Salford, England, United Kingdom
 Terni, Italy

Saint-Pierre-des-Corps
 Hebron, Palestine

Saint-Priest
 Mühlheim am Main, Germany

Saint-Quentin

 Kaiserslautern, Germany
 Rotherham, England, United Kingdom
 San Lorenzo de El Escorial, Spain
 Tongzhou (Beijing), China

Saint-Raphaël

 Jermuk, Armenia
 Sankt Georgen im Schwarzwald, Germany
 Tiberias, Israel

Saint-Sébastien-sur-Loire

 Cernavodă, Romania
 Glinde, Germany
 Kaposvár, Hungary
 Kati, Mali
 Porthcawl, Wales, United Kingdom

Sallaumines

 Lugau, Germany
 Torez, Ukraine
 Trbovlje, Slovenia
 Wodzisław Śląski, Poland

Salon-de-Provence

 Aranda de Duero, Spain
 Godmanchester, England, United Kingdom
 Gubbio, Italy
 Huntingdon, England, United Kingdom
 Szentendre, Hungary
 Wertheim, Germany

Sarcelles

 Hattersheim am Main, Germany
 Netanya, Israel

Sartrouville

 Kallithea, Greece
 Paços de Ferreira, Portugal
 Waldkraiburg, Germany

Saumur

 Formigine, Italy
 Verden an der Aller, Germany
 Warwick, England, United Kingdom

Saverne

 Donaueschingen, Germany
 Leominster, England, United Kingdom

Savigny-le-Temple

 Boutilimit, Mauritania
 Comarnic, Romania
 Iznalloz, Spain
 Ndjili, Democratic Republic of the Congo
 Tyresö, Sweden

Sc–Su
Sceaux

 Brühl, Germany
 Royal Leamington Spa, England, United Kingdom

Seclin

 Apolda, Germany
 Larkhall, Scotland, United Kingdom
 Méguet, Burkina Faso
 Zabrze, Poland

Sedan
 Eisenach, Germany

Sélestat

 Charleroi, Belgium
 Dornbirn, Austria
 Grenchen, Switzerland
 Waldkirch, Germany

Senlis

 Langenfeld, Germany
 Montale, Italy
 Pecherskyi (Kyiv), Ukraine

Sens

 Chester, England, United Kingdom
 Fafe, Portugal
 Lörrach, Germany
 Senigallia, Italy
 Vyshhorod, Ukraine

Sète

 Cetara, Italy
 El Jadida, Morocco
 Neuburg an der Donau, Germany

Sèvres

 Mount Prospect, United States
 Wolfenbüttel, Germany

La Seyne-sur-Mer

 Berdyansk, Ukraine
 Buti, Italy
 Maardu, Estonia
 Menzel Bourguiba, Tunisia

Six-Fours-les-Plages
 Emmendingen, Germany

Soyaux

 Ivančice, Czech Republic
 Monifieth, Scotland, United Kingdom
 Palos de la Frontera, Spain
 Sona, Italy

Stains

 Cheshunt, England, United Kingdom
 Figuig, Morocco
 Luco dei Marsi, Italy
 Saalfeld, Germany
 Sidi El Houari (Oran), Algeria

Strasbourg

 Boston, United States
 Dresden, Germany
 Leicester, England, United Kingdom
 Ramat Gan, Israel
 Stuttgart, Germany

Sucy-en-Brie

 Bietigheim-Bissingen, Germany
 Ofakim, Israel
 Scituate, United States
 Surrey Heath, England, United Kingdom
 Trujillo, Peru

Suresnes

 Colmenar Viejo, Spain
 Göttingen (district), Germany
 Hackney, England, United Kingdom
 Hann. Münden, Germany
 Holon, Israel
 Kragujevac, Serbia
 Villach, Austria

T
Talence

 Alcalá de Henares, Spain
 Chaves, Portugal
 Trikala, Greece

Tarascon

 Beit She'an, Israel
 Elmshorn, Germany
 Fraga, Spain
 Neviano degli Arduini, Italy
 Porrentruy, Switzerland
 Tarascon-sur-Ariège, France

Tarbes

 Altenkirchen, Germany
 Huesca, Spain

Taverny

 Borriana/Burriana, Spain
 Lüdinghausen, Germany
 Nysa, Poland
 Sedlčany, Czech Republic

La Teste-de-Buch

 Binghamton, United States
 Schwaigern, Germany

Thiais
 Einbeck, Germany

Thionville

 Gao, Mali
 Urbana, United States

Thonon-les-Bains
 Mercer Island, United States

Thouars

 Diepholz, Germany
 Hannut, Belgium
 Helensburgh, Scotland, United Kingdom
 Międzyrzec Podlaski, Poland

Tinqueux

 Leimen, Germany
 Myślenice, Poland

Torcy

 Girvan, Scotland, United Kingdom
 Lingenfeld, Germany

Toul
 Hamm, Germany

Toulon

 Kronstadt, Russia
 Mannheim, Germany
 Norfolk, United States
 La Spezia, Italy

Toulouse

 Atlanta, United States
 Bologna, Italy
 Chongqing, China
 Elche, Spain
 Kyiv, Ukraine
 Tel Aviv, Israel

Tourcoing

 Biella, Italy
 Bottrop, Germany
 Jastrzębie-Zdrój, Poland
 Mitte (Berlin), Germany
 Mühlhausen, Germany
 Partyzanski (Minsk), Belarus
 Rochdale, England, United Kingdom

Tournefeuille
 Graus, Spain

Tours

 Brașov, Romania
 Luoyang, China
 Minneapolis, United States
 Mülheim an der Ruhr, Germany
 Parma, Italy
 Segovia, Spain
 Takamatsu, Japan
 Trois-Rivières, Canada

Trappes

 Castiglione del Lago, Italy
 Congleton, England, United Kingdom
 Kopřivnice, Czech Republic

Tremblay-en-France

 Fatao, Mali
 Loropéni, Burkina Faso
 Marsciano, Italy

Troyes

 Alkmaar, Netherlands
 Brescia, Italy
 Chesterfield, England, United Kingdom
 Darmstadt, Germany
 Tournai, Belgium
 Zielona Góra, Poland

Tulle

 Bury, England, United Kingdom
 Dueville, Italy
 Errenteria, Spain
 Lousada, Portugal
 Schorndorf, Germany
 Smolensk, Russia

U
Les Ulis

 Naumburg, Germany
 Sátão, Portugal
 Sédhiou, Senegal
 Thetford, England, United Kingdom

V

Va–Ve
Valence

 Asti, Italy
 Batroun, Lebanon
 Biberach an der Riss, Germany
 Gedera, Israel
 Ijevan, Armenia
 Pushkin, Russia
 Tendring, England, United Kingdom

Valenciennes

 Agrigento, Italy
 Central AO (Moscow), Russia
 Düren, Germany
 Gliwice, Poland
 Medway, England, United Kingdom
 Yichang, China

La Valette-du-Var

 Bocșa, Romania
 Krościenko nad Dunajcem, Poland
 Liévin, France
 Novocherkassk, Russia
 Somma Lombardo, Italy
 Villingen-Schwenningen, Germany

Vallauris

 Hódmezővásárhely, Hungary
 Lindenberg im Allgäu, Germany

Valserhône

 Bretten, Germany
 Saint-Christophe, Italy

Vandœuvre-lès-Nancy

 Gedling, England, United Kingdom
 Grottaferrata, Italy
 Lemgo, Germany
 Poa, Burkina Faso
 Ponte de Lima, Portugal

Vannes

 Cuxhaven, Germany
 Fareham, England, United Kingdom
 Mons, Belgium
 Wałbrzych, Poland

Vanves

 Ballymoney, Northern Ireland, United Kingdom
 Lehrte, Germany
 Rosh HaAyin, Israel

Vélizy-Villacoublay

 Alytus, Lithuania
 Dietzenbach, Germany
 Harlow, England, United Kingdom

Vence

 Lahnstein, Germany
 Ouahigouya, Burkina Faso
 Stamford, England, United Kingdom

Vendôme

 Gevelsberg, Germany
 Hampton, United States
 Rizhao, China

Vénissieux

 Manises, Spain
 Oschatz, Germany

Verneuil-sur-Seine

 Aguilar de la Frontera, Spain
 Beaconsfield, Canada
 Weiterstadt, Germany

Vernon

 Bad Kissingen, Germany
 Massa, Italy

Vernouillet, Eure-et-Loir

 Cheddar, England, United Kingdom
 Felsberg, Germany

Vernouillet, Yvelines

 Alberndorf im Pulkautal, Austria
 Hainburg, Germany
 Trumau, Austria
 Yarm, England, United Kingdom

Versailles

 Carthage, Tunisia
 Gyeongju, South Korea
 Nara, Japan
 Potsdam, Germany
 Taipei, Taiwan

Vertou

 Morges, Switzerland
 Poděbrady, Czech Republic

Le Vésinet

 Oakwood, United States
 Outremont (Montreal), Canada
 Unterhaching, Germany
 Villanueva de la Cañada, Spain
 Worcester, England, United Kingdom

Vi–Vo
Vichy

 Bad Tölz, Germany
 Dunfermline, Scotland, United Kingdom

 Rhein-Neckar (district), Germany
 San Giuliano Terme, Italy
 Wilhelmshaven, Germany

Vienne

 Albacete, Spain
 Esslingen am Neckar, Germany
 Goris, Armenia
 Greenwich, United States
 Neath Port Talbot, Wales, United Kingdom
 Piotrków Trybunalski, Poland
 Schiedam, Netherlands
 Udine, Italy
 Velenje, Slovenia

Vierzon

 Barcelos, Portugal
 Bitterfeld-Wolfen, Germany
 Develi, Turkey
 Dongxihu (Wuhan), China
 Hereford, England, United Kingdom
 El Jadida, Morocco
 Kahale, Lebanon
 Kamienna Góra, Poland
 Miranda de Ebro, Spain
 Rendsburg, Germany
 Sig, Algeria

Vigneux-sur-Seine

 Limavady, Northern Ireland, United Kingdom
 Monção, Portugal
 Troyan, Bulgaria

Villebon-sur-Yvette

 Liederbach am Taunus, Germany
 Las Rozas de Madrid, Spain
 Saldus, Latvia
 Whitnash, England, United Kingdom

Villefontaine

 Bitterfeld-Wolfen, Germany
 Gremda, Tunisia
 Kahl am Main, Germany
 Salzano, Italy

Villefranche-de-Rouergue

 Bihać, Bosnia and Herzegovina
 Pula, Croatia
 Sarzana, Italy

Villefranche-sur-Saône

 Bertinoro, Italy
 Bühl, Germany
 Călărași District, Moldova
 Kandi, Benin
 Schkeuditz, Germany

Villejuif

 Dunaújváros, Hungary
 Mirandola, Italy
 Neubrandenburg, Germany
 Vila Franca de Xira, Portugal
 Yambol, Bulgaria

Villemomble

 Droylsden, England, United Kingdom
 Hardtberg (Bonn), Germany
 Portimão, Portugal

Villenave-d'Ornon

 Bridgend, Wales, United Kingdom
 Seeheim-Jugenheim, Germany
 Torres Vedras, Portugal

Villeneuve-d'Ascq

 Haidari, Greece
 Iași, Romania
 Leverkusen, Germany
 Ouidah, Benin
 La Possession, Réunion, France
 Racibórz, Poland
 Stirling, Scotland, United Kingdom
 Tournai, Belgium

Villeneuve-la-Garenne
 Hof, Germany

Villeneuve-le-Roi

 Arpino, Italy
 São Pedro do Sul, Portugal
 Stourport-on-Severn, England, United Kingdom
 Vratsa, Bulgaria

Villeneuve-Saint-Georges

 Eastleigh, England, United Kingdom
 Kornwestheim, Germany

Villeneuve-sur-Lot

 Ávila, Spain
 Bouaké, Ivory Coast
 Neustadt bei Coburg, Germany
 San Donà di Piave, Italy
 Troon, Scotland, United Kingdom

Villeparisis

 Maldon, England, United Kingdom
 Pietrasanta, Italy
 Wathlingen, Germany

Villepinte
 Schwendi, Germany

Villeurbanne

 Abanilla, Spain
 Abovyan, Armenia
 Bat Yam, Israel
 Mogilev, Belarus

Villiers-sur-Marne

 Entroncamento, Portugal
 Friedberg, Germany

Vincennes

 Blackrock, Ireland
 Castrop-Rauxel, Germany
 Lambeth, England, United Kingdom
 Montigny-le-Tilleul, Belgium
 Tomar, Portugal
 Vincennes, United States

Vire-Normandie

 Baunatal, Germany
 Săcele, Romania
 Santa Fe, Spain
 Totnes, England, United Kingdom

Viry-Châtillon

 Erftstadt, Germany
 Wokingham, England, United Kingdom

Vitré

 Djenné, Mali
 Greece, United States
 Helmstedt, Germany
 Lymington, United Kingdom
 Środa Wielkopolska, Poland
 Tălmaciu, Romania
 Terrebonne, Canada
 Villajoyosa, Spain

Vitrolles
 Mörfelden-Walldorf, Germany

Vitry-sur-Seine

 Burnley, England, United Kingdom
 Kladno, Czech Republic
 Meissen, Germany

Voiron

 Bassano del Grappa, Italy
 Droitwich Spa, England, United Kingdom
 Herford (district), Germany
 Šibenik, Croatia

Voisins-le-Bretonneux

 Irvine, Scotland, United Kingdom
 Łuków, Poland
 Schenefeld, Germany

W
Wasquehal
 Beyne-Heusay, Belgium

Wattrelos

 Eschweiler, Germany
 Guarda, Portugal
 Köthen, Germany
 Mohács, Hungary
 Siemianowice Śląskie, Poland

Y
Yerres

 Mendig, Germany
 Sainte-Brigitte-de-Laval, Canada

Yvetot

 Hemmingen, Germany
 Kyjov, Czech Republic
 Lanark, Scotland, United Kingdom
 Murowana Goślina, Poland

Yzeure

 Bendorf, Germany
 Gherla, Romania
 Kafountine, Senegal

References

France
France geography-related lists
Foreign relations of France
-
Populated places in France